Bogton is a rural area in Aberdeenshire, Scotland. To the south is Whitehill Wood and megalithic circle.

References

Villages in Aberdeenshire